The Cavan Senior Football Championship is an annual Gaelic Athletic Association club competition between the top Cavan Gaelic football clubs. It was first competed for in 1888. The winners get the Oliver Plunkett Cup and qualifies to represent their county in the Ulster Club Championship and in turn, go on to the All-Ireland Senior Club Football Championship. Cornafean have won the most titles, having been victorious 20 times. The current Senior football champions are Gowna after beating Killygarry in the final of 2022.

Format
12 teams will contest the Hotel Kilmore Senior Football Championship.

The championship shall be run on a league basis up to the Quarter-Final stage and Knock-out thereafter. Each team will play 4 rounds in the league phase against different opponents with the fixtures decided by a random draw at the conclusion of each round. Placings in the league stage shall be decided in accordance with rule 6.21 of the GAA Official Guide 2016 as amended below:

6.21 (4) If a Championship is partly organised on a League basis, the following Regulations shall apply:
(a) League Results shall be credited as follows: 2 points for a win, and one for a draw.
(b) If a Team is Disqualified or Retires during the course of a League Stage, its played games shall stand and its un-played games shall be awarded to the opposing teams..

The top 8 teams in the league progress to the Quarter-Finals while the bottom 4 placed teams in the league enter a Relegation Playoff with 1 team to be relegated to the Cavan Intermediate Football Championship.

Winners listed by club

Finals listed by year

References

External links
 Cavan at ClubGAA
 Official Cavan GAA Website

 
Cavan GAA Football championships
Senior Gaelic football county championships